Abbott is an unincorporated community in southern Craig County, Virginia, United States.
It lies along State Route 311 south of the town of New Castle, the county seat of Craig County.

References

Unincorporated communities in Craig County, Virginia
Unincorporated communities in Virginia